David Armenta (born 1950 in Commerce, California) is a former mayor of Pico Rivera, California.

Armenta was elected to the Pico Rivera City Council in 2001 and was re-elected in 2005 and 2009. He served as the mayor in 2005 and 2006. Armenta serves as a member of the League of California Cities and the Sister Cities Committee.

In 2006 Armenta ran for the California State Assembly but came in 3rd place in the Democratic primary.

Armenta, born in 1950, received a Bachelor's degree from University of Redlands and his Master's degree in Public Law and Contracts from Northrop University Law Center.

References

External links
Official Pico Rivera website profile

Mayors of places in California
1950 births
Living people
People from Commerce, California
People from Pico Rivera, California
Northrop University alumni
Mayors of Pico Rivera, California